Rolling coal is the practice of modifying a diesel engine to emit large amounts of black or grey sooty exhaust fumes—diesel fuel that has not undergone complete combustion. It is a predominantly North American phenomenon (more specifically in the United States and Canada), despite being illegal.

Rolling coal is sometimes used as a form of anti-environmentalism. Such modifications may include the intentional removal of the particulate filter. Practitioners often additionally modify their vehicles by installing smoke switches, large exhausts, and smoke stacks. Modifications to a vehicle to enable rolling coal may cost from US$200 to US$5,000.

Background
Rolling coal is a form of conspicuous air pollution, used for entertainment or as protest. Some drivers intentionally trigger coal rolling in the presence of hybrid vehicles (a practice nicknamed "Prius repellent") to cause their drivers to lose sight of the road and inhale harmful air pollution. Coal rolling may also be directed at foreign vehicles, bicyclists, protesters, and pedestrians. Practitioners cite "American freedom" and a stand against "rampant environmentalism" as reasons for coal rolling.

A concern is road traffic safety violations, as the black smoke impairs visibility, increasing the risks of motor vehicle crashes, and is a violation of clean air laws. 

Some incidents have led to injuries. In 2021, six bicyclists training for a road race were run over by a 16-year-old who was rolling coal along Business U.S. Highway 290 in Waller County, Texas, outside Houston. Two of the cyclists were injured severely enough to require medical evacuation by helicopter. The motorist, a teenaged boy, was not charged at the time of the accident; local cyclists' groups were outraged. He was later charged with six felony counts of aggravated assault with a deadly weapon.

Legality

United States
In July 2014, the United States Environmental Protection Agency stated that the practice was illegal, as it violated the Clean Air Act which prohibits the manufacturing, sale, and installation "of a part for a motor vehicle that bypasses, defeats, or renders inoperative any emission control device” and “prohibits anyone from tampering with an emission control device on a motor vehicle by removing it or making it inoperable prior to or after the sale or delivery to the buyer."

State law

California 

California law prohibits operating a vehicle "in a manner resulting in the escape of excessive smoke, flame, gas, oil, or fuel residue". The California Highway Patrol or local police can cite a vehicle under this section or others for rolling coal.

Colorado 
Prohibits nuisance exhibition of motor vehicle exhaust, which is the knowing release of soot, smoke, or other particulate emissions from a motor vehicle with a gross vehicle weight rating of 14,000 pounds or less into the air and onto roadways, other motor vehicles, bicyclists, or pedestrians, in a manner that obstructs or obscures another person's view of the roadway, other users of the roadway, or a traffic control device or otherwise creates a hazard to a driver, bicyclist, or pedestrian.

Connecticut

Indiana 
"The engine and power mechanism of a motor vehicle must be equipped and adjusted so as to prevent escape of excessive fumes or smoke".

Kansas 
Vehicles must be equipped and adjusted to prevent the escape of excessive fumes or smoke.

Maryland 
A person may not knowingly or intentionally cause a diesel-powered motor vehicle to discharge clearly visible smoke, soot, or other exhaust emissions onto another person or motor vehicle. Normal operations, commercial vehicles of 10,000 pounds or more, and construction site vehicles are exempt.

Massachusetts 
"No person operating a diesel-powered vehicle shall intentionally release significant quantities of soot, smoke, or other particulate emissions into the air, onto roadways or other vehicles in a manner that obstructs or obscures another person's view of the roadway, other users of the roadway, or a traffic control device or otherwise creates a hazard to a driver."

New Jersey 

New Jersey Department of Environmental Protection regulations also prohibit "smoking vehicles", and the department has a reporting hotline.

North Carolina 
In 2016, a question to the Western North Carolina Air Quality Director about "rolling coal" referenced state law. Vehicles driven on a highway must have equipment to prevent "annoying smoke and smoke screens". During any mode of operation, diesel-powered vehicles cannot emit for longer than five consecutive seconds visible contaminants darker than a specific density.

Texas 
The Texas Commission on Environmental Quality (TCEQ) decommissioned its state-wide smoking vehicle reporting program. Reports on smoking vehicles can still be made through the North Central Texas Regional Smoking Vehicle Program in the Dallas–Fort Worth area, which includes Collin, Dallas, Denton, Ellis, Erath, Hood, Hunt, Johnson, Kaufman, Navarro, Palo Pinto, Parker, Rockwall, Somervell, Tarrant, and Wise counties.

Utah 
The Department of Motor Vehicles may suspend or revoke a vehicle's registration if notified by a local health department that the vehicle is unable to meet state or local air emissions standards. Except during warmup or heavy tow, or for vehicles with a gross vehicle weight greater than 26,000 pounds, a diesel engine may not emit visible contaminants during operation if manufactured after 2007, or may not emit contaminants greater than a specific density if manufactured before 2008.

An incident of coal rolling on a cyclist was captured on camera in August 2018 and referred to the Kane County attorney. In March 2020 cast members of the Utah-based Diesel Brothers reality television series, and the companies they own, were fined a total of $850,000 for Clean Air Act violations.

County or municipal ordinances and reporting

Hudson, Colorado 
It shall be unlawful for any person to engage in a nuisance exhibition of motor vehicle exhaust, which is the knowing release of soot, smoke, or other particulate emissions from a motor vehicle with a gross vehicle weight rating of fourteen thousand (14,000) pounds or less into the air and onto roadways, other motor vehicles, bicyclists, or pedestrians, in a manner that obstructs or obscures another person's view of the roadway, other users of the roadways, or a traffic control device or otherwise creates a hazard to a driver, bicyclist, or pedestrian. The ordinance, which was passed in September 2017, exempts several categories of vehicles, and provides for a fine up to $499.

Overland Park, Kansas 
The engine and power mechanism of every motor vehicle shall be so equipped and adjusted as to prevent the escape of excessive fumes or smoke.

Salt Lake, Davis, Utah, Weber/Morgan Counties, Utah 
These counties have "smoking vehicle" report forms online.

Cheyenne, Wyoming 
A person shall not engage in a nuisance exhibition of motor vehicle exhaust, which is the knowing release of soot, smoke, or other particulate emissions from a motor vehicle with a gross vehicle weight rating of fourteen thousand (14,000) pounds or less into the air and onto roadways, other motor vehicles, bicyclists, or pedestrians, in a manner that obstructs or obscures another person's view of the roadway, other users of the roadway, or a traffic control device, or otherwise creates a hazard to a driver, bicyclist, or pedestrian. The ordinance, which was passed in July 2017, exempts several categories of vehicles and provides for a fine of up to $750 and up to six months in jail. A first attempt in July 2016 failed, but Cheyenne police had clarified at that time that they had been writing tickets for coal rolling under state law.

Canada

Provincial Law

British Columbia
"A person who contravenes this section commits an offence and is liable on conviction to a fine of not less than $50 and not more than $5,000."

Ontario
Section 75.1 of the Ontario Highway Traffic Act prohibits modifications to a vehicle's emissions systems to increase emissions output exceeding that of the manufacturer's specifications, and modifications which tamper a vehicle’s emission control system to bypass, disable or otherwise negate it. Furthermore, Ontario Regulation 169/22 restricts the opacity of vehicle emissions and modifications to a vehicle's emissions system. Violations can result in a fine ranging from $300 to $1000 CAD for non-commercial vehicles, and $400 to $20 000 for commercial vehicles.

See also
 Truck nuts
 Wet stacking, a term for when diesel engines exhaust unburned fuel, whether unintentionally or as part of rolling coal

References

External links

Air pollution
Environmental skepticism
Car culture
Environmental crime
Exhaust systems
Hazardous motor vehicle activities
Automotive terminology
Waste of resources